Parides steinbachi is a species of butterfly in the family Papilionidae. It is endemic to Bolivia.

References

steinbachi
Fauna of Bolivia
Endemic fauna of Bolivia
Papilionidae of South America
Taxonomy articles created by Polbot